Hour of Mystery is an hour-long UK mystery anthology television series. Donald Wolfit introduced each of the episodes, which were produced by ABC Weekend TV and aired on the ITV network in 1957.

Only two of the episodes are known to exist, out of the 20 made.

Episodes included adaptations of The Man in Half Moon Street, The Woman in White, Portrait in Black, and Night Must Fall.

External links

References

1950s British anthology television series
1957 British television series debuts
1957 British television series endings
Black-and-white British television shows
Lost television shows
1950s British drama television series
Television shows produced by ABC Weekend TV